The 2010–11 Spartan South Midlands Football League season was the 14th in the history of Spartan South Midlands Football League a football competition in England.

Premier Division

The Premier Division featured 19 clubs which competed in the division last season, along with four new clubs:

Aylesbury United, relegated from Southern Football League
Hadley, promoted from Division One
Holmer Green, promoted from Division One
Stotfold, transferred from the United Counties League

Also, Kingsbury London Tigers changed name to London Tigers.

League table

Division One

Division One featured 17 clubs which competed in the division last season, along with five new clubs:

Berkhamsted, promoted from Division Two
London Lions, joined from the Herts Senior County League
St Albans City Reserves, joined from the Capital League
Welwyn Garden City, relegated from the Premier Division
Wodson Park, promoted from Division Two

League table

Division Two

Division Two featured 14 clubs which competed in the division last season, along with two new clubs:
Brache Sparta, relegated from Division One
Winslow United, returned to the league after missing one season

League table

References

External links
 Spartan South Midlands Football League

2010-11
9